Kilphedir  is a small remote settlement, which sits in the Strath Ullie valley (known also as Strath of Kildonan) in Helmsdale, Sutherland, east coast of the Scottish Highlands and is in the Scottish council area of Highland.

The River Helmsdale flows past Kilphedir following the A897 road.

References

Populated places in Sutherland